There are many terms used to describe association football, the sport most commonly referred to in the English-speaking world as "football" or "soccer".

Background 
The rules of Association football were codified in England by the Football Association in 1863. The alternative name soccer was first coined in late 19th century England to help distinguish between several codes of football that were growing in popularity at that time, in particular rugby football. The word soccer is an abbreviation of association (from assoc.) and first appeared in English Public Schools and universities in the 1880s (sometimes using the variant spelling "socker") where it retains some popularity of use to this day. The word is sometimes credited to Charles Wreford-Brown, an Oxford University student said to have been fond of shortened forms such as brekkers for breakfast and rugger for rugby football (see Oxford -er). However, the attribution to Wreford-Brown in particular is generally considered to be spurious. Clive Toye noted "they took the third, fourth and fifth letters of Association and called it SOCcer."

The sport's full name Association football has never been widely used, although in Britain some clubs in rugby football strongholds adopted the suffix Association Football Club (A.F.C.) to avoid confusion with the dominant sport in their area, and FIFA, the world governing body for the sport, is a French-language acronym of "Fédération Internationale de Football Association" – the International Federation of Association Football. "Soccer football" is used less often than it once was: the United States Soccer Federation was known as the United States Soccer Football Association from 1945 until 1974, when it adopted its current name; and the Canadian Soccer Association was known as the Canadian Soccer Football Association from 1958 to 1971.

Transition away from soccer 

For nearly a hundred years after it was first coined, soccer was used as an uncontroversial alternative in Britain to football, often in colloquial and juvenile contexts, but was also widely used in formal speech and in writing about the game. "Soccer" was a term used by the upper class whereas the working and middle classes preferred the word "football"; as the upper class lost influence in British society from the 1960s on, "football" supplanted "soccer" as the most commonly used and accepted word. There is evidence that the use of soccer is declining in Britain and is now considered (albeit incorrectly, due to the word's British origin) to be an American English term. Since the early twenty-first century, the peak association football bodies in soccer-speaking Australia and New Zealand have actively promoted the use of football to mirror international usage and, at least in the Australian case, to rebrand a sport that had been experiencing difficulties. Both bodies dropped soccer from their names. These efforts have met with considerable success in New Zealand.

English-speaking countries 
Usage of the various names of association football vary among the countries or territories who hold the English language as an official or de facto official language. The brief survey of usage below addresses places which have some level of autonomy in the sport and their own separate federation but are not actually independent countries: for example the constituent countries of the United Kingdom and some overseas territories each have their own federation and national team. Not included are places such as Cyprus, where English is widely spoken on the ground but is not amongst the country's specifically stated official languages.

Countries where it is called football 
Association football is known as "football" in the majority of countries where English is an official language, such as the United Kingdom, the Commonwealth Caribbean (including Trinidad and Tobago, Jamaica, Belize, Barbados, and others), Nepal, Malta, India, Bangladesh, Nigeria, Cameroon, Pakistan, Liberia, Singapore, Hong Kong and others, stretching over many regions including parts of Europe, Asia, Africa, the Caribbean and Central America.  In North America and Australia (where approximately 70 per cent of native English speakers reside), soccer is the primary term.

Fitbaa, fitba or fitbaw is a rendering of the Scots pronunciation of "football", often used in a humorous or ironic context.

North America 
In the United States, where American football is more popular, the word football is used to refer only to that sport. Association football is most commonly referred to as soccer.

As early as 1911 there were several names in use for the sport in the Americas. A 29 December 1911 New York Times article reporting on the addition of the game as an official collegiate sport in the US referred to it as "association football", "soccer" and "soccer football" all in a single article.

The sport's governing body is the United States Soccer Federation; however, it was originally called the U.S. Football Association, and was formed in 1913 by the merger of the American Football Association and the American Amateur Football Association. The word "soccer" was added to the name in 1945, making it the U.S. Soccer Football Association, and it did not drop the word "football" until 1974, when it assumed its current name.

In Canada, similar to the US, the term "football" refers to gridiron football (either Canadian football or American football; le football canadien or le football américain in Standard French). "Soccer" is the name for association football in Canadian English (similarly, in Canadian French, le soccer). Likewise, in majority francophone Quebec, the provincial governing body is the Fédération de Soccer du Québec. This is unusual compared to francophone countries, where football is generally used. Canada's national body government of the sport is named the Canada Soccer Association, although at first its original name was the Dominion of Canada Football Association.

Some teams based in the two countries have adopted FC as a suffix or prefix in their names; in Major League Soccer; these include Austin FC, Minnesota United FC, Chicago Fire FC, Atlanta United FC, FC Dallas, Seattle Sounders FC, Toronto FC, Vancouver Whitecaps FC, New York City FC, Los Angeles FC, FC Cincinnati and Charlotte FC, while two MLS teams (Inter Miami CF and CF Montréal) used the CF as a suffix or prefix in their names, reflecting to the Spanish-speaking and Francophone communities of the respective teams that originate from. All teams in the Canadian Premier League (with the notable exception of Atlético Ottawa due to the team being owned by Atlético Madrid) used FC as a suffix while FC Edmonton is the only team in the league that uses it as a prefix.

In Central America, the only English-speaking nation is Belize, and like the other six Central American nations, the unqualified term football refers to association football, as used in the Football Federation of Belize and in the Belize Premier Football League. The term soccer is sometimes used in vernacular speech and media coverage, however.

In the Caribbean, most of the English-speaking members use the word football for their federations and leagues, the exception being the U.S. Virgin Islands, where both federation and league use the word soccer.

An exceptional case is the largely Spanish-speaking Puerto Rico, where the word football is used in the Puerto Rican Football Federation, while the word soccer is used in the Puerto Rico Soccer League, the Puerto Rican 1st division; however, its 2nd division is named Liga Nacional de Futbol de Puerto Rico. Soccer is the most common term in vernacular speech, however. Another case is the Dutch island of Sint Maarten, where soccer is used in Sint Maarten Soccer Association, but neither football nor soccer appears in its league name: instead, the Dutch name, voetbal is used.

Australia 

Traditionally, the sport has been mainly referred to as soccer in Australia.  This is primarily due to Australian rules football taking precedence of the name in conversation due to its greater cultural prominence and popularity - similarly to North America and gridiron football. However, in 2005, the Australia Soccer Association changed its name to Football Federation Australia, and it now encourages the use of "football" to describe the association code in line with international practice. All state organisations, many clubs, and most media outlets have followed its example. The Macquarie Dictionary observed, writing prior to 2010: "While it is still the case that, in general use, soccer is the preferred term in Australia for what most of the world calls football, the fact that the peak body in Australia has officially adopted the term football for this sport will undoubtedly cause a shift in usage." This was highlighted shortly afterwards when the Australian prime minister, speaking in Melbourne, referred to the sport as football, emphasising her choice when questioned. The Australian men's team is still known by its long-standing nickname, the Socceroos and "soccer" is still the most popular term for the sport in Australia.

New Zealand 

In New Zealand English, association football has historically been called "soccer". As late as 2005, the New Zealand Oxford Dictionary suggested that in that country "football" referred especially to rugby union; it also noted that rugby union was commonly called "rugby", while rugby league was called "league". A year earlier, New Zealand Soccer had reorganised its leading competition as the New Zealand Football Championship, and in 2007 it changed its own name to New Zealand Football. The wider language community appears to have embraced the new terminology—influenced, among other things, by television coverage of association football in other parts of the world—so that today, according to The New Zealand Herald, "most people no longer think or talk of rugby as 'football'. A transformation has quietly occurred, and most people are happy to apply that name to the world's most popular game, dispensing with 'soccer' in the process."

Papua New Guinea 
In Papua New Guinea and other parts of Melanesia, the term "soccer" is the preferred term for the sport, due to the large Australian influence in the region. In Papua New Guinea, the national association is the Papua New Guinea Football Association but the national league is the Papua New Guinea National Soccer League. In Tok Pisin, "soka" refers to "soccer", "ragbi" refers to rugby and "futbal" refers to other codes of football (i.e. Australian rules football, or "futbal bilong Ostrelia").

Other English-speaking countries 
On the island of Ireland, "football" or "footballer" most often refers to association football or Gaelic football. It may also refer to rugby union. The association football federations are called the Football Association of Ireland (FAI) and the Irish Football Association (IFA) and the top clubs are called "Football Club". Furthermore, those whose primary interest lies in this game often call their sport "football" and refer to Gaelic football as "Gaelic football" or "Gaelic" (although they may also use "soccer"). The terms "football" and "soccer" are used interchangeably in Ireland's media.

In most of Ulster, the northern province in Ireland, especially in Northern Ireland, East Donegal and Inishowen, association football is usually referred to as 'football' while Gaelic football is usually referred to as 'Gaelic'.

In Pakistan, Liberia, Nigeria and other English-speaking countries, both football and soccer are used both officially and commonly.

Non-English-speaking countries 
Association football, in its modern form, was exported by the British to much of the rest of the world and many of these nations adopted this common English term for the sport into their own language. This was usually done in one of two ways: either by directly importing the word itself, or as a calque by translating its constituent parts, foot and ball. In English, the word football was known in writing by the 14th century, as laws which prohibit similar games date back to at least that century.

From English football 
 Albanian: futboll
 Armenian: ֆուտբոլ (futbol)
 Bangla: ফুটবল (futbol)
 Belarusian: футбол (futbol)
 Bulgarian: футбол (futbol), the sport was initially called ритнитоп (ritnitop, literally "kickball"); footballers are still sometimes mockingly called ритнитопковци (ritnitopkovtsi "ball kickers") today.
 Catalan: futbol
 Czech: fotbal (kopaná for "kick game" is also used)
 Filipino: futbol (ᜉᜓᜆ᜔ᜊᜓᜎ᜔ in baybayin)
 French: football (except in French Canada where it is soccer)
 Galician: fútbol
 Hindi: फ़ुटबॉल (futbol)
 Japanese:フットボール (futtobōru: represents "football") is a variant, but サッカー (sakkā: represents "soccer") is most commonly used in Japanese, as in 日本サッカー協会 (lit. Japan Soccer Association, but the official English name is Japan Football Association). From 1885 to around 1908 in the Meiji era, fūtobōru (フートボール) was the most common and assoshieshon (アッソシエーション) was also used, and these were often written together with kemari (蹴鞠), a game of the Heian period. From the Taisho era to the early Showa era, ashiki futtobōru (ア式フットボール), ashiki shūkyū (ア式蹴球) and shūkyū (蹴球) were often used.
 Kannada: ಫುಟ್‌ಬಾಲ್ (phutball)
 Kazakh: футбол (futbol)
 Kyrgyz: футбол (futbol)
 Latvian: futbols
 Lithuanian: futbolas
 Macedonian: фудбал (fudbal)
 Malayalam: ഫുട്ബോൾ (phutball)
 Maltese: futbol
 Marathi: फुट्बॉल् (phutball)
 Persian: فوتبال (futbâl)
 Polish: futbol, as well as the native term piłka nożna literally "foot-ball"
 Portuguese: futebol
 Romanian: fotbal
 Russian: футбол (futbol)
 Serbian: фудбал (fudbal)
 Slovak: futbal
 Spanish: fútbol or futbol; the calque balompié, from the words "balón" (ball) and "pie" (foot), is seldom used.
 Tajik: футбол (futbol)
 Telugu: ఫుట్‌బాల్ (phutball)
 Thai: ฟุตบอล (fút-bol)
 Turkish: futbol
 Ukrainian: футбол (futbol), occasionally called копаний м'яч (kopanyi myach), literally "kicked ball" or simply копаний (kopanyi)
 Uzbek: futbol
 Yiddish: פוטבאָל (futbol)
This commonality is reflected in the auxiliary languages Esperanto and Interlingua, which utilize futbalo and football, respectively.

Literal translations of foot ball (calques) 
 Arabic: كرة القدم (kurat al-qadam; however, in vernacular Arabic, كرة (kura), meaning "ball," is far more common. فوتبول (fūtbōl) is also fairly common, particularly in the former French colonies of Morocco, Algeria, and Tunisia.)
 Breton: mell-droad
 Bulgarian: ритнитоп (ritnitop) literally "kickball")
 Chinese: 足球 (Hanyu Pinyin: zúqiú, Jyutping: zuk1 kau4) from 足 = foot and 球 = ball 
 Hong Kong daily Cantonese:  踢波 (tek3 bo1) where 踢 means kick, and 波 is a phonetic imitation of ball, (literally 波 means sea wave in Chinese).
 Danish: fodbold
 Dutch: voetbal
 Estonian: jalgpall
 Faroese: fótbóltur
 Finnish: jalkapallo
 Georgian: ფეხბურთი (pekhburti), from ფეხი (pekhi = foot) and ბურთი (burti = ball).
 German: Fußball
 Greek: ποδόσφαιρο (podosphero), from πόδι (podi) = "foot" and σφαίρα (sphera) = "sphere" or "ball". In Greek-Cypriot, the sport is called "mappa" (μάππα), which means "ball" in this dialect.
 Hebrew:  כדורגל (kaduregel), a portmanteau of the words "כדור" (kadur: ball) and "רגל" (regel: foot, leg).
 Icelandic: fótbolti, but knattspyrna (from knöttur ("ball") + spyrna ("kicking")) is almost equally used.
 Karelian: jalgamiäččy
Kinyarwanda: umupira w'amaguru(from umupira ("ball") + amaguru ("legs"), literally "ball of legs")
 Latvian: kājbumba (the historic name in the first half of the 20th century, a literal translation from English).
 Malayalam: Kaalppanthu, from "Kaal" (foot) and "Panthu" (ball).
 Manx: bluckan coshey
 Norwegian: fotball
 Polish: piłka nożna, from piłka (ball) and noga (leg). 
 Scottish Gaelic: ball-coise
 Sinhala: පා පන්දු = paa pandu
Somali: kubada cagta - kubada "ball" and cagta"feet or foot".
Swahili: mpira wa miguu, from mpira (ball), wa (of) and miguu (feet/legs).
 Swedish: fotboll
 Tamil: கால்பந்து, கால் (kaal) = foot and பந்து (pandhu) = ball
 Ukrainian: occasionally called копаний м'яч (kopanyi myach), literally "kicked ball" or simply копаний (kopanyi)
 Welsh: pêl-droed

In the first half of the 20th century, in Spanish and Portuguese, new words were created to replace "football" (fútbol in Spanish and futebol in Portuguese), balompié (balón and pie meaning "ball" and "foot") and ludopédio (from words meaning "game" and "foot") respectively. However, these words were not widely accepted and are now only used in club names such as Real Betis Balompié and Albacete Balompié.

From soccer 
 Afrikaans: sokker, echoing the predominant use of "soccer" in South African English.
 Bulgarian: сокър (sokur)
 Canadian French: soccer, pronounced like the English word. In Quebec, in New-Brunswick, etc. the word football refers either to American or Canadian football, following the usage of English-speaking North America.
 Japanese: sakkā (サッカー) is more common than futtobōru (フットボール) because of American influence following World War II. While the Japan Football Association uses the word "football" in its official English name, the Association's Japanese name uses sakkā. 
 Irish: sacar
 Manx Gaelic: soccar or sackyr
 Swahili: soka
 Tok Pisin: soka

Other forms 
 Italian: calcio (from calciare, meaning to kick), although football is also widely understood, as many clubs include Football Club in their official denomination. This is due to the game's resemblance to Calcio Fiorentino, a 16th-century ceremonial Florentine court ritual, that has now been revived under the name il calcio storico or calcio in costume (historical kick or kick in costume).
 Bosnian, Croatian, Slovene: nogomet. The word is derived from "noga" (meaning "leg") and "met" (meaning "to throw"), hence "throwing the ball using legs".
 In Erzya: пильгеоска (pilgeoska).
 In Hungarian futball or labdarúgás (meaning ball-kicking), but foci is used in the common language.
 In Burmese, where the game was introduced in the 1880s by Sir James George Scott, it is called ball-pwe, a pwe being a rural all-night dance party, something like a rave.
 In Lao, the term "ບານເຕະ:ban-te", literally meaning "ball-kicking", is used to denote "football".
 In Navajo: jooł nabízníltaałí, meaning "ball is kicked around".
 In Vietnamese, the terms "bóng đá" and "đá banh" (the latter is only used in certain regions), both literally meaning "ball-kicking", are used to denote "football". Sometime Sino-Vietnamese term "túc cầu" (足球) is used.
 In Indonesian, the term sepak bola ("ball kicking") is used whereas Malaysian and Singaporean Malay use bola sepak ("kickball"); the latter is famously attested in the 1859 Jawi booklet Inilah Risalat Peraturan Bola Sepak Yang Dinamai oleh Inggeris Football ("This is a Rulebook for Kick-ball that the English call Football") printed in Singapore.
 In Korean, the Sino-Korean derived term chukku (蹴球 축구 ), "kick-ball", is used.
In Swahili, the word kandanda which has no transparent etymology, is used alongside mpira wa miguu and soka.
In Khmer, the term "បាល់ទាត់" (kick-ball) is used.

Other terminology 
Aside from the name of the game itself, other foreign words based on English football terms include versions in many languages of the word goal (often gol in Romance languages). In German-speaking Switzerland, schútte (Basel) or tschuutte (Zürich), derived from the English shoot, means 'to play football'. Also, words derived from kick have found their way into German (noun Kicker) and Swedish (verb kicka). In France le penalty means a penalty kick. However, the phrase tir au but (lit. shot(s) on the goal) is often used in the context of a penalty shootout. In Brazilian Portuguese, because of the pervasive presence of football in Brazilian culture, many words related to the sport have found their way into everyday language, including the verb chutar (from shoot) – which originally meant "to kick a football", but is now the most widespread equivalent of the English verb "to kick". In Bulgaria a penalty kick is called duzpa (дузпа, from French words douze pas – twelve steps). In Italy, alongside the term calcio, is often used pallone (literally ball in Italian), especially in Sicily (u palluni). In Hong Kong, 十二碼 (literally ten two yard, where ten two means twelve) is referring to the penalty kick, which is at 12 yards away from the goal line.

Notes

References 

Association football
Names